Gustavo Kuerten was the defending champion, but chose not to participate that year.

Rafael Nadal won in the final 6–0, 6–7(2–7), 6–1, against Alberto Martín.

Seeds

Draw

Finals

Top half

Bottom half

References

External links
Draw
Qualifying Draw

Singles